Hugh Fletcher Buckingham (born 13 Sept. 1932) was  Archdeacon of the East Riding from 1988 to 1998.

He was educated at Lancing College; Hertford College, Oxford; and Westcott House, Cambridge. He was ordained in 1958  before embarking on an ecclesiastical career with  curacies in Halliwell and Sheffield. He held incumbencies at Guestwick, Hindolveston and Fakenham before his appointment as Archdeacon.

References

1932 births
People educated at Lancing College
Alumni of Hertford College, Oxford
Archdeacons of the East Riding
Bishops of Colchester
Alumni of Westcott House, Cambridge
Living people